BAE Batterien GmbH is a producer of lead acid batteries for automotive and industrial applications and is headquartered in Germany since 1899.

The company is selling its batteries worldwide for the use in photovoltaic (solar-power related), telecommunication systems, electric utilities, railroads, uninterruptible power supply (UPS) and motive-power applications including lift trucks, forklift trucks, high-rack stackers, etc.

References

External links
BAE Batterien
BAE Batteries USA

Electric vehicle battery manufacturers
Manufacturing companies based in Berlin
Manufacturing companies established in 1899
Electronics companies of Germany
German brands
1899 establishments in Germany